Botany is a New Zealand parliamentary electorate, returning one Member of Parliament to the New Zealand House of Representatives. It was contested for the first time at the 2008 general election, and won by Pansy Wong for the National Party. Following Wong's resignation in late 2010, a by-election returned Jami-Lee Ross, who was confirmed by the voters in the 2011 general election. Ross left the National Party in October 2018 and became an independent. Ross did not contest the seat at the 2020 general election, and was succeeded by the new National candidate, Christopher Luxon, who became the party's leader and the Leader of the Opposition in November 2021.

Background 
The Representation Commission established the electoral district of Botany  after the 2006 New Zealand census due to high population growth in and around Auckland. The new electorate resulted from several sweeping changes to the electoral landscape of South Auckland:

 The southern end of Port Waikato was lanced and combined with the area around Clevedon township to form .
 The resultant change pulled the Clevedon electorate tighter around the city of Papakura for which the electorate is now named.
 In the north, Manukau East was pulled up through Otahuhu into Auckland City, in the process dropping the western suburbs of Flat Bush, East Tāmaki, Dannemora and Botany Downs, which combined with fragments of the Clevedon and Pakuranga electorates to form Botany.

Demographics
Demographically, Botany is older than the rest of New Zealand, with over half of its population aged over 30; It has three times as many Chinese New Zealanders than the national average (33.5 versus 9.2%), and nearly twice as many Pacific Islanders (13 to 7%), which makes Botany a minority-majority electorate.  Botany has the highest number of people born overseas of any New Zealand electorate (49% in 2006), the most Buddhists in a New Zealand electorate and the highest number of one-family homes. The average income in the electorate is high, with over half of the electorate's residents earning over $50,000 a year.

A 2005 academic survey assessing the voting behaviour of Asian New Zealanders showed a strong preference for the Labour Party, with a sizeable proportion prepared to vote for the National Party (47 to 40); it also showed that among Asian New Zealanders, the most important issues were the economy and law and order. This was demonstrated by a large anti-crime march (a crowd of 15,000 was estimated, with a significant number of these being Asian New Zealanders) was held in Auckland (on the streets of Botany) in July 2008 amidst claims of increasing violent crime in New Zealand targeted against its Asian population. The march's organiser Peter Low used his website to clarify his position, calling for harsher sentencing, victims' rights and zero "criminal rights".

History
Botany was first created for the 2008 general election, and won by Pansy Wong for the National Party.

Both National and the ACT party stood Chinese New Zealanders as their candidates in 2008; Pansy Wong and Kenneth Wang, respectively. Labour chose Koro Tawa, an Auckland University lecturer. Raymond Huo, a Chinese-speaking lawyer, was initially mooted for the Labour nomination, but eventually chose to stand as a list-only candidate.

On 14 December 2010 it was announced that a by-election was to be held on 5 March 2011 due to the resignation of incumbent MP Pansy Wong. The electorate was won by Jami-Lee Ross from the New Zealand National Party.

In October 2018, Jami-Lee Ross resigned from the National Party and accused party leader Simon Bridges of breaching electoral law. Ross announced his intention to resign from parliament and run as an independent in the resulting by-election, however he later decided against resigning. Christopher Luxon won the National Party selection in November 2019.

On 15 September 2020 Ross announced he was no longer intending to contest the electorate, but will instead contest the upcoming election as a list only candidate for his newly formed party, Advance NZ.

Members of Parliament
Key

List MPs
Members of Parliament elected from party lists in elections where that person also unsuccessfully contested the Botany electorate. Unless otherwise stated, all MPs' terms began and ended at general elections.

Key

Election results

2020 election

2017 election

2014 election

2011 election

Electorate (as at 26 November 2011): 43,204

2011 by-election
Official results of the 5 March by-election.

2008 election

Table footnotes

References

External links
Electorate Profile  Parliamentary Library

New Zealand electorates
New Zealand electorates in the Auckland Region
2008 establishments in New Zealand